Blepharella is a genus of flies in the family Tachinidae.

Species

B. abana (Curran, 1927)
B. alacris (Curran, 1927)
B. analis (Curran, 1927)
B. arrogans (Curran, 1927)
B. atricauda Mesnil, 1970
B. bicolor (Mesnil, 1968)
B. carbonata Mesnil, 1952
B. chionaspis (Bezzi, 1908)
B. confusa Mesnil, 1952
B. erebiae Mesnil, 1970
B. fallaciosa Mesnil, 1970
B. fascipes (Villeneuve, 1943)
B. fuscicosta (Curran, 1927)
B. fuscipennis Mesnil, 1952
B. grandis (Curran, 1927)
B. haemorrhoa Mesnil, 1970
B. hova Mesnil, 1952
B. imitator (Curran, 1927)
B. instabilis (Curran, 1927)
B. intensica (Curran, 1927)
B. laetabilis (Curran, 1927)
B. lateralis Macquart, 1851
B. lodosi Mesnil, 1968
B. melita (Curran, 1927)
B. neglecta Mesnil, 1968
B. oldi Mesnil, 1952
B. orbitalis (Curran, 1927)
B. pellucida Mesnil, 1970
B. perfida Mesnil, 1970
B. picturata (Curran, 1927)
B. rex (Curran, 1927)
B. rubricosa (Villeneuve, 1933)
B. ruficauda Mesnil, 1952
B. setifacies (Curran, 1927)
B. setigera (Corti, 1895)
B. seydeli (Mesnil, 1949)
B. snyderi (Townsend, 1916)
B. tenuparafacialis Chao & Shi, 1982
B. vasta (Karsch, 1886)
B. versatilis (Villeneuve, 1910)
B. vivax (Curran, 1927)
B. vulnerata (Curran, 1927)
B. xanthaspis Mesnil, 1970

References

Diptera of Asia
Exoristinae
Tachinidae genera
Taxa named by Pierre-Justin-Marie Macquart